Lars Unger (born 30 September 1972) is a German former professional footballer who played as a midfielder for Werder Bremen, Fortuna Düsseldorf, Southend United, SC Bregenz, and Brinkumer SV. He also represented the Germany U21 national team.

Career
Unger made his debut for Southend United in a Third Division match, in the 3–1 away defeat against Halifax Town at The Shay on 13 February 1999.

References

External links
 
 
 

Living people
1972 births
People from Eutin
German footballers
Footballers from Schleswig-Holstein
Association football midfielders
Germany under-21 international footballers
SV Werder Bremen players
SV Werder Bremen II players
Fortuna Düsseldorf players
Southend United F.C. players
SW Bregenz players
Austrian Football Bundesliga players
Bundesliga players
2. Bundesliga players
English Football League players
German expatriate sportspeople in Austria
Expatriate footballers in Austria
German expatriate sportspeople in England
Expatriate footballers in England